Fourth World is the debut album by the Brazilian jazz group Fourth World that was released on B&W Music in 1993.

Track listing

Personnel
Airto Moreira – drums, percussion, vocals
Flora Purim – vocals, percussion
José Neto – guitars and vocals
Gary Meek – alto, soprano and tenor saxophones, flute, keyboards, Hammond organ, glockenspiel and EWI
Diana Moreira – vocals (track 5)
Chil Factor – rap (track 10)

References

1993 albums
Flora Purim albums
Airto Moreira albums